This article shows all participating team squads at the 2011 FIVB Women's Club World Championship, held from October 8 to 14, 2011 in Doha, Qatar.

Pool A

Mirador Santo Domingo
Head Coach:  Wilson Sánchez

VakıfBank Türk Telekom Istanbul
Head Coach:  Giovanni Guidetti

Kenya Prisons
Head Coach:  David Lingaho

Pool B

Rabita Baku

Head Coach:  Zoran Gajic

Sollys Nestlé Osasco
Head Coach:  Luizomar de Moura

Chang Bangkok
Head Coach:  Kiattipong Radchatagriengkai

References 

C
C